Tord André Lien (born 10 September 1975 in Øksnes) is a Norwegian politician for the Progress Party and served as the Minister of Petroleum and Energy from 2013 to 2016. He was also a member of Parliament from Sør-Trøndelag from 2005 to 2013. Lien is the holder of an advanced degree in history (cand. philol.), having written his thesis on aspects of Norway's defence policy in the early 20th century.

Political career

Local politics
Lien was a member of Trondheim city council from 2003 to 2005.

Parliament
He was elected to the Norwegian Parliament from Sør-Trøndelag in 2005, and was re-elected in 2009. On 30 April 2012, he announced that he wouldn’t be seeking re-election for the 2013 election.

Minister of Petroleum and Energy
Following the Conservative faction’s victory in the 2013 election, Lien was appointed minister of petroleum and energy in Erna Solberg's Cabinet. 

On 20 December 2016, he was succeeded by Terje Søviknes as minister of petroleum and energy in a cabinet reshuffle. Lien stated that he stepped down in order to take care of his family, notably that his wife had drawn the line for his job as minister. He had originally intended to stay on until at least the 2017 election.

Other
In 1994, Lien was involved in a serious road accident and was sentenced to 40 days prison for speeding and traffic violations.

Personal life
Lien is married to Kristin Reitstøen, with whom he has two daughters.

References

External links

1975 births
Living people
Progress Party (Norway) politicians
Members of the Storting
Petroleum and energy ministers of Norway
Norwegian prisoners and detainees
Prisoners and detainees of Norway
21st-century Norwegian politicians
People from Øksnes